Bruce Allan Boudreau (born January 9, 1955) is a Canadian professional ice hockey coach and former player. He previously served as head coach of the Washington Capitals, Anaheim Ducks, Minnesota Wild, and Vancouver Canucks of the National Hockey League (NHL). As a player, Boudreau played professionally for 20 seasons, and was a third round pick (42nd overall) of the Toronto Maple Leafs at the 1975 NHL Amateur Draft. He played 141 games in the NHL with the Maple Leafs and Chicago Black Hawks, and 30 games in the World Hockey Association (WHA) with the Minnesota Fighting Saints. Boudreau played most of his career in the American Hockey League (AHL) for various teams where he was known for his goals and point-scoring abilities, recording 316 goals and 483 assists for 799 points in 634 games.

After his playing career Boudreau went into coaching and won the Jack Adams Award for the NHL's most outstanding head coach in the 2007–08 NHL season during his tenure with the Capitals. Boudreau is the owner of two junior ice hockey teams, Minnesota Blue Ox and Hershey Cubs, in the United States Premier Hockey League (USPHL).

As of 2021, Boudreau has the second-highest winning percentage in NHL history for a coach who has coached at least 900 games.

Early life
Boudreau was born in North York, Toronto, Ontario, the son of Norman Boudreau and Theresa Roy. As a youth, he played in the 1967 Quebec International Pee-Wee Hockey Tournament with the Toronto George Bell minor ice hockey team. He attended Nelson A. Boylen Collegiate Institute in the 1970s.

Playing career
Boudreau's junior career was spent with the Toronto Marlboros of the Ontario Hockey Association (OHA), for which he averaged over 100 points a season. He scored 165 points in his final season in juniors, adding 44 points in 27 games en route to captaining the Marlies to a Memorial Cup championship. He was awarded the Eddie Powers Memorial Trophy as the top goal scorer for the 1974–75 OMJHL season.

Boudreau played professional hockey for 17 seasons. While his major professional career was modest, he had a long career in the minor leagues, and was one of the most prolific minor league scorers of all time, largely in the American Hockey League (AHL). 

After being drafted to the NHL in the third round, 42nd overall, by the Toronto Maple Leafs, Boudreau could not agree with Toronto on a contract and joined the Minnesota Fighting Saints of the WHA, making his professional debut in 1975. He played a single season for the Fighting Saints, scoring 3 goals and 6 assists over 30 games. He spent half that season in the minors, with the Johnstown Jets of the North American Hockey League (NAHL).

Boudreau signed with the Maple Leafs for the 1976–77 season. He spent most of the first nine seasons of his career with the Maple Leafs playing with their farm teams: Central Hockey League (CHL) teams Dallas Black Hawks and Cincinnati Tigers, and AHL teams New Brunswick Hawks and St. Catharines Saints. Later in his career, Boudreau signed with the NHL's Chicago Black Hawks, playing two seasons with their AHL farm team Springfield Indians (with whom he won his only league scoring championship in the 1987–88 AHL season). He later played with the International Hockey League's (IHL) Fort Wayne Komets and the AHL's Nova Scotia Oilers.

Boudreau played parts of eight seasons in the NHL, all but the lasta seven-game stint for the Chicago Black Hawks in 1985–86 seasonfor the Maple Leafs. His most significant NHL time came in 1980–81; called up as an injury replacement with the Maple Leafs, he scored 10 goals and 14 assists in only 39 games. During his time in the NHL, Boudreau scored a lifetime 28 goals and 42 assists in 141 games.

He continued on as a minor league star and top scorer right through his final 1991–92 AHL season. His final game came in Springfield whenafter a full IHL season with the Fort Wayne Kometshe was signed by the AHL's Adirondack Red Wings as an emergency injury replacement during their first round Calder Cup playoff series against the Indians.

Hockey-related endeavours
At the start of his professional career, while a member of the Johnstown Jets of the NAHL, Boudreau appeared as an extra in the 1977 hockey film Slap Shot; his apartment at the time was used in the film for Paul Newman's character, coach of the fictional Charlestown Chiefs.

Boudreau is the owner of two junior ice hockey teams, Minnesota Blue Ox and Hershey Cubs, in the United States Premier Hockey League.

He joined the NHL Network as an analyst when he is not coaching.

Personal life
Boudreau is married to Crystal, with whom he has four children; three sons and one daughter. In 1982 Boudreau started the Golden Horseshoe Hockey School, a youth summer hockey camp operating out of St. Catharines, Ontario, which he continues to coach with in the off-seasons.

Boudreau has been a supporter of the Toronto Maple Leafs since childhood, and admits that he still cheers for the club when the team does not face off against a squad that he is actively coaching, and watches Maple Leafs games on television when he is able to.

Boudreau is known for his talkative personality, earning him the nickname "Gabby." In 2009, he released his memoir, Gabby: Confessions of a Hockey Lifer.

Playing achievements
 
 Scored 100 points or more for five separate minor league teams.
 Named to the Central Hockey League's First All-Star Team in 1982.
 Named to the American Hockey League's First All-Star Team in 1988.
 Inducted into the 2009 class of the AHL Hall of Fame.

 Team records – Springfield Indians
 Assists in a season: 74, 1987–88
 Points in a season: 116, 1987–88

 Awards
 Eddie Powers Memorial Trophy – 1974–75 OMJHL season, Toronto Marlboros
 John B. Sollenberger Trophy – 1987–88 AHL season, Springfield Indians
 Memorial Cup and J. Ross Robertson Cup with the 1974–75 Toronto Marlboros

Career statistics

Coaching career

Minor leagues
After his playing days were over, Boudreau began a highly successful coaching career. In the minor leagues, Boudreau has coached the Muskegon Fury, Fort Wayne Komets, Mississippi Sea Wolves, Lowell Lock Monsters, Manchester Monarchs, and Hershey Bears.

Under Boudreau's leadership, the Bears won the 2006 AHL Calder Cup championship. The Bears made it all the way back to the Calder Cup finals under Coach Boudreau again in 2007, ultimately falling to the Hamilton Bulldogs.

Previously, Boudreau coached the Mississippi Sea Wolves to the ECHL Championship in 1999, and also led the Fort Wayne Komets to the IHL Finals in 1994. Boudreau was awarded the Commissioner's Trophy (IHL) as coach of the 1993–94 Komets.

Washington Capitals (2007–2012)

Boudreau was named interim head coach of the NHL's Washington Capitals on November 22, 2007, and later their permanent coach on December 26. He compiled a 37–17–7 rookie coaching record with a team that was 6–14–1 when he inherited it. Under Boudreau's leadership, the 2007–08 Capitals won their first Southeast Division title in seven years and made the playoffs for the first time in five years. He also won the Jack Adams Award as the NHL's best coach in 2008.

Boudreau continued his success in his second season as coach of the Capitals, leading the Capitals to a record of 50–24–8 and 108 points, good enough for another Southeast Division title and second in the Eastern Conference.

In his third season with the Capitals, Boudreau led the team to a 54–15–13 record and 121 points, which was not only good enough for a third straight Southeast Division title, but also was the most points in the NHL, leading to the team's first Presidents' Trophy. Their success in the regular season, however, did not carry over to the postseason, as they lost to the eighth seeded Montreal Canadiens in seven games, losing the last three games of the series.

After a hot start to the 2011–12 season, the Capitals fell apart, posting just four wins in 13 games during the month of November. Alexander Ovechkin and Alexander Semin both vastly underperformed during the stretch. These and other factors led to Boudreau's firing on November 28, 2011, despite Boudreau having reached 200 regular season wins faster than any coach in the modern NHL era. He was replaced by former Capitals captain and then-London Knights head coach Dale Hunter.

Anaheim Ducks and Minnesota Wild (2012–2020)
Two days after he was fired by the Capitals, the Anaheim Ducks hired Boudreau to replace the recently fired Randy Carlyle as their head coach. Boudreau became the fastest coach to be hired after being fired in NHL history.

On April 29, 2016, Boudreau was fired by the Ducks after they lost a Game 7 on home ice for the fourth consecutive year. He led the Ducks to four consecutive division titles in his four full seasons in Anaheim.

On May 7, 2016, Boudreau was hired by the Minnesota Wild as their new head coach. Boudreau led the Wild to a successful regular season finishing 2nd in the Central Division (earning home ice advantage for round 1), but the team fell apart in March, after the Martin Hanzal trade, and collapsed in the first round of the playoffs winning just 1 game on the road and losing every game at home against the St. Louis Blues. With the latest early round knock-out of a team that shone during the regular season, Boudreau has cemented his reputation as a coach who has failed to achieve success in the Stanley Cup playoffs. During his fourth season with the Wild, he was fired on February 14, 2020.

Vancouver Canucks (2021–2023)
On December 5, 2021, Boudreau was named head coach of the Vancouver Canucks, whose poor season to that point had led to the dismissal of both head coach Travis Green and general manager Jim Benning. His immediate positive impact on the team's performance resulted in him being serenaded regularly during home games with a variation of the Tag Team song "Whoomp! (There It Is)" lyric, "Bruce, there it is!" On January 23, 2022, Boudreau coached in his 1,000th career NHL game in a 3–1 loss to the St. Louis Blues. Ultimately, the Canucks would not make the playoffs in Boudreau's first season, despite a significant uptick in performance and a winning record under Boudreau.

In the off-season, the Canucks' new president of hockey operations, Jim Rutherford, indicated that they would not immediately extend Boudreau's contract beyond the option for one more season in his initial arrangement. It was subsequently reported that Rutherford, who had been hired after Boudreau, was initially unaware that the latter's contract contained an option for a second year. After the Canucks began the 2022–23 season with a franchise-record seven-game losing streak, Rutherford became publicly critical of the team's performance and, implicitly, of Boudreau. The Province noted "the optics of the owner first hiring Boudreau and then Rutherford were never good," as it was typically management's job to hire the coach. 

By January 2023, as the Canucks continued to sink in the standings, Rutherford admitted that he had been speaking to potential replacements for Boudreau. Days later, it began to be reported that Boudreau would soon be replaced by Rick Tocchet. The unusual spectacle of an NHL coach continuing in his job as a lame duck began to attract considerable media attention. Addressing the rumours in advance of a January 20 game, Boudreau acknowledged "I'd be a fool to say I don't know what's going on." Despite the team subsequently losing that game to the Colorado Avalanche by a score of 4–1, fans in the stands revived the "Bruce, there it is!" chant in support of Boudreau. Speaking afterward, he said that "I've only been here a year, but it'll go down in my memory books out of the 48 years I've played and coached as the most incredible thing I've experienced on a personal level other than winning championships." On January 21, with media reports that Boudreau would be formally replaced the following Monday (January 23), he oversaw what was believed to be his final game as coach, with the team falling 4–2 to the Edmonton Oilers. He was again saluted by the audience, and said that numerous players had approached him after the game to bid farewell, though he had not heard anything from management. On January 22, the Canucks announced that Boudreau had been fired and replaced by Tocchet. The saga of Boudreau's firing, particularly the publicly-perceived mistreatment of the coach in his final few weeks, became a major news story that was widely reported on beyond the sports world, with criticism being directed towards Rutherford and Canucks management for their treatment of Boudreau. During Tocchet's subsequent introductory press conference, Rutherford apologized for the manner in which Boudreau's dismissal had been handled.

Head coaching record

References

External links
 
 

1955 births
Living people
Adirondack Red Wings players
Anaheim Ducks coaches
Baltimore Skipjacks players
Canadian expatriate ice hockey players in Germany
Canadian expatriate ice hockey players in the United States
Canadian ice hockey centres
Canadian ice hockey coaches
Chicago Blackhawks players
Cincinnati Tigers players
Dallas Black Hawks players
ECD Iserlohn players
Fort Wayne Komets players
Hershey Bears coaches
Eishockey-Bundesliga players
Ice hockey people from Toronto
Jack Adams Award winners
Johnstown Jets players
Minnesota Fighting Saints draft picks
Minnesota Fighting Saints players
Minnesota Wild coaches
New Brunswick Hawks players
Newmarket Saints players
Nova Scotia Oilers players
Phoenix Roadrunners (IHL) players
St. Catharines Saints players
Springfield Indians players
Toronto Maple Leafs draft picks
Toronto Maple Leafs players
Toronto Marlboros players
Vancouver Canucks coaches
Washington Capitals coaches
World Hockey Association first round draft picks